The Maserati Levante (Tipo M161) is a mid-size luxury crossover SUV produced by Italian manufacturer Maserati at the Mirafiori factory in Turin since 2016. P> The Levante went on sale in Europe in May 2016, and in North America in September 2016.

The Levante was named after a warm, easterly wind that blows in the western Mediterranean Sea, southern France, down to the Strait of Gibraltar. The name of the wind, in turn, comes from the Latin word “levare”, which means “to rise”. Its design is based on the Kubang concept car that debuted at the 2011 Frankfurt Auto Show.

Announcements
The concept that led to the Levante, the Maserati Kubang, was unveiled in 2011 at the Frankfurt Auto Show. The Levante was first unveiled at the Geneva Motor Show on 1 March 2016, followed by a 2016 New York Auto Show. Models for the United States went on sale in April 2016. Early models included Levante (350 PS) and Levante S (430 PS). 

Canada models went on sale in September 2016. Early models included Levante (350 PS) and Levante S (430 PS). The Maserati Levante Trofeo was unveiled at the 2018 New York International Auto Show.

Specifications
The Levante initially featured Ferrari's 3.0L V6 engine, in two states of tune. A diesel model is also offered, which served as the only engine offering for right hand drive markets from 2016 to the end of 2017, until the official announcement and deployment of gasoline RHD models in the middle of 2017, starting with the Levante S and subsequently the base Levante sometime in 2018.

By 2018, a 560 horsepower V8 was planned to be added. Subsequently, two V8 models were announced in 2018: the 590 horsepower Trofeo, followed by the 550 horsepower GTS. The Levante gains an eight speed ZF automatic transmission from the sixth generation Maserati Quattroporte. 

The vehicle's drivetrain is four-wheel-drive only, and like other Maserati models (Quattroporte and Ghibli in both rear and all wheel drive), comes standard with a rear limited-slip differential. The Levante also features Maserati Touch Control with a full color  TFT touchscreen display, as well as a reconfigurable TFT gauge cluster with full color.

Gallery

References

External links 
Maserati Levante Official website (U.S.)

Cars introduced in 2016
Levante
Mid-size sport utility vehicles
Luxury sport utility vehicles
Luxury crossover sport utility vehicles
All-wheel-drive vehicles